Jabal or Yabal ( – Yabal) is an individual mentioned in the Hebrew Bible, in .

Family 
Jabal (a descendant of Cain) was the son of Lamech and Adah, and the brother of Jubal, half-brother of Tubal-cain and Naamah. He is described as the "ancestor of all who live in tents and raise livestock."

Theories 
Francis Nigel Lee interprets Genesis 4:20 to mean that Jabal was both the "father of all cattle ranchers" and the "father of all tent-dwellers", and as such as the "pioneer of all livestock and agricultural technology" as well as the "pioneer of all architecture." Lee notes that Jabal was probably also a weaver, and thus "the pioneer of the clothing industry."

Gordon Wenham, on the other hand, understands the verse to indicate Jabal was the first "dweller with herds." That is, he was the "father of the Bedouin lifestyle." He notes that whereas Abel "merely lived off his flocks," Jabal could "trade with his beasts of burden," and that this "represents cultural advance."

Family tree

References

External links

Book of Genesis people